Nine ships of the Royal Navy have been named HMS Lily or HMS Lilly:

 , of 12 guns and 110 tons, purchased in 1642 and under the command of Captain Isaias Blowfield when she was wrecked in September 1653 when she was driven ashore in a storm.
 , a 6-gun ketch launched in 1657 and sold in 1667.
 , a 6-gun sloop launched in 1672 and under the command of Captain William Sherwin when she foundered in 1674.
HMS Lily, a 16-gun brig-sloop. She was formerly the brig Sir Charles Grey, purchased in 1795 and named . She was renamed Lily (or Lilly) in 1800, captured by the French privateer Dame Ambert in 1804, and renamed Général Ernouf.
HMS Lilly, a brig, the former British East India Company packet ship Swallow, launched in 1779, purchased in 1804, and sold in 1811.
, a 16-gun  launched in 1837, converted to coal hulk C29 in 1860, renamed C15 and sold in 1908.
, a 4-gun  launched in 1861 and broken up in 1867. 
, a 3-gun  launched in 1874 and wrecked off Labrador in 1889.
, an  launched in 1915, converted to a depot ship in 1923, renamed Vulcan II. She was renamed Adamant II in 1930 and sold the same year.

Notes

References

Royal Navy ship names